Aaron Schneider (born July 26, 1965) is an American filmmaker and cinematographer.

His short film Two Soldiers (2003) won the Academy Award for Best Live Action Short Film. He won an Independent Spirit Award for his feature film debut, Get Low (2009).

Early life
Schneider was born in 1965 in Springfield, Illinois, and raised in Dunlap, Illinois. He is a graduate of the University of Southern California. He is of Jewish background, and his father Delwin Schneider was a Korean War veteran.

Career
His cinematography work includes the TV series Murder One (for which he was nominated for a 1996 Emmy Award) and the pilot episode of the series Supernatural, as well as the films Kiss the Girls and Simon Birch. He was also the second unit director of photography for Titanic.

In 2004, he won the Academy Award for Best Live Action Short Film for the live action short film Two Soldiers (shared with producer Andrew J. Sacks). The 40-minute short was based on a short story written by William Faulkner.

Schneider's first feature film, Get Low, drew positive reviews when it premiered at the 2009 Toronto International Film Festival, and was subsequently purchased for distribution by Sony Pictures Classics. The film was released in the US on July 30, 2010. It stars Robert Duvall in a much-lauded performance, in addition to Sissy Spacek, Bill Murray, and Lucas Black. It earned Schneider the Independent Spirit Award for Best First Feature.

In 2020, after a decade hiatus from features, Schneider directed Greyhound, a World War II drama centered on the Battle of the Atlantic and starring Tom Hanks.

Filmography

Film
Feature films

Short film
 (2003) Two Soldiers

Cinematographer
 (1990) Dead Girls
 (1997) Kiss the Girls 
 (1998) Simon Birch

References

External links
 

1965 births
American cinematographers
Crossroads School alumni
Directors of Live Action Short Film Academy Award winners
Film directors from Los Angeles
Living people